A hallway or corridor is an interior space in a building that is used to connect other rooms. Hallways are generally long and narrow.

Hallways must be sufficiently wide to ensure buildings can be evacuated during a fire, and to allow people in wheelchairs to navigate them. The minimum width of a hallway is governed by building codes. Hallways are wider in higher-traffic settings, such as schools and hospitals.

In 1597 John Thorpe is the first recorded architect to replace multiple connected rooms with rooms along a corridor each accessed by a separate door.

References

External links

Rooms